Winnifred "Wendy" Torrance is a fictional character and protagonist of the 1977 horror novel The Shining by the American writer Stephen King. She also appears in the prologue of Doctor Sleep, a 2013 sequel to The Shining.

Character
She is portrayed by Shelley Duvall in the 1980 film adaptation of the novel directed by Stanley Kubrick, by Rebecca De Mornay in the 1997 television miniseries directed by Mick Garris, and played by Alex Essoe in the 2019 film adaptation of Doctor Sleep directed by Mike Flanagan.

Unlike Jack Torrance, little of Wendy's background is revealed in the novel. A bad relationship with her emotionally abusive mother is mentioned. In the film version, the character is much less nuanced than in the book and in the miniseries (written by King himself), where she appears as a "central" character, leading to some critics to refer to the character as "two different versions of Wendy Torrance". Stephen King has often stated that Wendy's submissiveness is one of the main reasons for his aversion to Kubrick's film. Writer Chelsea Quinn Yarbro also criticized Wendy's "weakness" as portrayed in the novel, attributing it to King's general inability to paint convincing female characters.

Other critics have spoken of the novel's Wendy as a "modern Gothic heroine", although not stereotyped.

See also
 Lists of horror film characters
 Stephen King bibliography

Notes

References

Further reading
 Jackie Eller, Wendy Torrance, One of King's Women: A Typology of King's Female Characters, in Tony Magistrale, The Shining Reader, Mercer Island, Starmont House, 1991

Stephen King characters
The Shining (franchise)
Characters in American novels of the 20th century
Literary characters introduced in 1977
Female horror film characters
Female characters in literature